GoWarrior is an open-source and community-supported computing platform. GoWarrior is designed for the world of makers, hackers, educators, hobbyists, and newbies to build electronics projects. It offers a complete package of hardware, software and cloud service.

TIGER Board 
TIGER Board is a single-board computer performs as hardware for GoWarrior platform. It contains ARM Cortex A9[3] based M3733-AFAAA (SoC), ARM Mali-400 MP2, as well as integrated 1GB DDR3 RAM.

Hardware specification 
GoWarrior specifications are:

Available operating systems

GoDroid 
GoDroid is an Android KitKat 4.4.4. based optimized operating system for GoWarrior platform. In addition to original Android functionalities, GoDroid pre-integrates some useful middleware components and libraries, as well as some self-developed function blocks, which makes it also a software development kit for Android applications.

Features

Booting option 

GoDroid supports booting from NAND Flash or from MicroSD card that contains the boot code and image files.

Multimedia 
By replacing Android native media engine StageFright with GStreamer and utilizing hardware acceleration facilities, GoDroid supports various audio/video/container hardware decoding and multiple network protocols including Microsoft Smooth Streaming, HTTP Live Streaming and KODI 14.2 has variety of supported video/audio plug-ins.

Wireless display standards 
Besides the screen mirroring function of Android Miracast, GoDroid also implements DLNA system service for sharing digital media among multimedia devices. DMR, DMS and DMP are supported.

Programming language 
In addition to C/C++/Java, GoDroid also integrates QPython2engine for Python 2 programming on Android.

Inter-connection with other OSH platform 
TIGER Board provides 2 sets of 40-pin expansion headers, one of which is compatible to Raspberry Pi connector. Raspberry Pi Python applications can be ported and run on GoDroid.

Integrated development environment 
GoDroid supports Android Studio as application IDE. With API level 19 configuration to match GoDroid provides the availability of not only original Android API, but also proprietary extended API, such as GPIO/IC2/SPI/PWM.

Debugging 
GoDroid supports standard ADB debugging via Ethernet, Wi-Fi and USB.

GoBian 
GoBian is a Linux-embedded operating system running on TIGER Board for the GoWarrior platform.

GoBian is developed based on Raspbian which is from Debian 7 wheezy armhf, and differs from Raspbian for the extra features, for example, GoBian encapsulates the RPi.gpio and other I/O libraries to facilitate transplanting projects which use the related libraries from Raspberry Pi to TIGER Board. Furthermore, GoBian provides support for multimedia by integrating GOF, KODI and other middle-ware modules and applications out-of-the-box.

Features

Networking & remote access 
GoBian enables the Internet connection through Ethernet or Wi-Fi through the Ethernet port and Wi-Fi module on TIGER Board, and thus supports various methods to access the projects and transfer data, such as FTP, SSH.

Timekeeping 
GoBian automatically synchronizes the system time with Internet time servers using the NTP protocol.

File system 
GoBian integrates a built-in file system for data management.

Built-in programming environments 
C, C++, Python, Perl, and shell script.

I/O interfaces 
GoBian lets you call the GPIO/I2C/UART/SPI interfaces directly in your projects with the built-in RPi.gpio and other libraries.

Multimedia 
GoBian makes it easy for the secondary development of multimedia applications with the customized GOF middle-ware for TIGER Board.

Multitasking 
The on-board M3733-AFAAA processor makes GoBian a multitasking system with good performance.

Linux software 
The software programs that are available for Debian are basically compatible with GoBian.

Low-power sleep mode 
GoBian supports the ultra-power-saving sleep mode (PMU Standby), with the entire board power consumption as low as 0.35W.

Multi-screen sharing 
GoBian integrates with DLNA to fully support the multimedia sharing and multi-screen interaction.

Community support 
The GoWarrior community is already launched to support your projects with GoBian.

CloudQ 
CloudQ is a comprehensive back-end community support to help users easily build up their projects.

References

External links 
 GoWarrior
 ARM

ARM-based single-board computers
Linux-based devices
Internet of things
Open hardware electronic devices
Educational hardware